The Saber is an Emirati low-observable, long-range air-launched cruise missile developed by Halcon Systems for United Arab Emirates Air force.

References 


Cruise missiles